The 2018–19 Liga Națională is the 61st season of Romanian Handball League, the top-level men's professional handball league. The league comprises 14 teams. Dinamo București are the defending champions, for the third season in a row.

Team changes

To Liga Națională
Promoted from Divizia A
 CSM Bacău
 HC Buzău 
 Universitatea Cluj

From Liga Națională
Relegated to Divizia A
 HC Vaslui 
 Politehnica Iași
 Odorheiu Secuiesc

Notes:
 HC Buzău promoted via an extra play-off match, after the winner of Divizia A, Seria B, CSM Oradea declined its participation.

 HC Vaslui withdrew from the championship and Universitatea Cluj was invited to fill the vacancy.

Teams

League table

Play-off

First round
The top eight teams from regular season will be distributed in two main groups consisting of four teams each. In the group the teams will meet twice (6 matches per team) and at the end, they will qualify for the knockout phase. Teams start the group phase with a certain number of points (6, 4 or 2), depending on the place occupied in the regular season.

Seria A

Seria B

Second round
The teams that played in the first round of the play-offs will also play in the second round, but for different objectives, depending on the rankings obtained in the previous round. The winners of the Seria A and Seria B groups will play in the league final, the second places will compete for the "bronze medal" and a place in the 2019–20 EHF Cup, the third places will fight for the 5th place and the last ranked teams will play against each other for the 7th place. All the finals were played in a best-of-three games format.

League table – positions 1–4

League table – positions 5–8

Play-out
The bottom six teams from regular season will meet twice (10 matches per team) to contest against relegation. Teams start the play-out round with a number of points ranging from 1 to 5, depending on the place occupied in the regular season. The winner of the Relegation round finishes 9th in the overall season standings, the second placed team - 10th, and so on, with the last placed team in the Relegation round being 14th.

Promotion/relegation play-offs
The 11th and 12th-placed teams of the Liga Națională faced the 3rd and 4th-placed teams of the Divizia A promotion tournament. The first two places promoted to Liga Națională and the last two relegated to Divizia A. The play-offs were played on neutral ground, in Drobeta-Turnu Severin.

Season statistics

Number of teams by counties

References

External links
 Romanian Handball Federaration 

Liga Națională (men's handball)
2018 in Romanian sport
2019 in Romanian sport
2018–19 domestic handball leagues